Saint Anastasia the Roman was a nun martyred under the Roman emperor Decius around the year 250. She is celebrated on 29 October. This St. Anastasia should not be confused with another St. Anastasia of Rome who was martyred with St. Basilissa in 68 AD.

See also
List of saints named Anastasia

References

Bibliography
Saint Anastasia The Great Martyr from Jehanne d'Arc
Orthodox Wiki

Year of birth unknown
250 deaths
Saints from Roman Italy
Ante-Nicene Christian female saints